Cave Johnson (January 11, 1793 – November 23, 1866) was an American politician who served the state of Tennessee as a Democratic congressman in the United States House of Representatives. Johnson was the 12th United States Postmaster General in the administration of James K. Polk from 1845-1849.

Biography
Johnson was born near present-day Springfield, Tennessee to Robert and Mary Noel Johnson. He was named for Rev. Richard Cave, a Baptist minister in the Travelling Church with whom Mary's mother, also named Mary Noel, had been acquainted in Kentucky. He suspected but could never prove a relation to William Cave Johnson of Boone County, Kentucky. He was studying at Cumberland College when the War of 1812 began, and organized a band of volunteers that Andrew Jackson declined. In 1813 he joined his father's militia unit in the Creek War, returning to Nashville the next year to complete law studies in the firm of Parry Wayne Humphreys.

Johnson settled in Clarksville and served on its first board of aldermen. At the time of his first election to Congress in 1829, he owned an iron factory that employed both free and enslaved black workers. He advocated legal protection of slavery under the federal constitution, believing that this would prevent "moderate" southerners from being overwhelmed by secessionist Fire-Eaters.

Samuel Morse's proposal for the Baltimore–Washington telegraph line came before Congress for funding during Johnson's tenure. Johnson mocked the idea by introducing a rider to fund research into animal magnetism. After the line was successfully demonstrated he apologized to Morse, calling the telegraph an "astonishing invention."

Johnson acted as a campaign manager for presidential candidate James K. Polk at both the Democratic party convention and for the general election. After his victory Polk appointed him Postmaster General, which he held during the full term. He shifted the department from a collect on delivery system to a prepaid system by introducing the adhesive postage stamp in 1847, and is also credited with introducing street corner collection boxes in urban areas. Johnson's duties included overseeing operation of the Baltimore–Washington line, which he struggled to make profitable as other private telegraph lines were constructed. He urged that telegraph lines not be left in unregulated private hands, concerned that they would ruin the Post Office while enriching those who held preferential information access, but his fellow Democrats were unreceptive.

He later served as a state circuit court judge and as president of the Third Bank of Tennessee from 1854 to 1860. During the secession crisis he joined the short-lived Union Party that sought to keep Tennessee loyal to the federal government. He joined in drafting an address that urged the state to remain in the Union while refusing to participate in coercive measures against the Confederacy. Failing in this effort, he sided with the Confederacy but took no personal part in the war. After the Battle of Fort Donelson brought Clarksville under Union control, Johnson was one of three spokesmen who greeted the administering Union officer. He was elected to the state Senate in 1866, but allies of Republican Governor William G. Brownlow refused to seat him.

Johnson proposed to Elizabeth Dortch in 1815. She rejected him for another suitor, embarrassing him so deeply that he dared not pursue a woman again for more than twenty years. His next proposal in 1838 was to the same Elizabeth Dortch, by then widowed. She accepted and they had three sons. Johnson was the maternal uncle of Lt. Col. Cave Johnson Couts of California

References

External links

 Stuart A. Rose Manuscript, Archives, and Rare Book Library, Emory University: Cave Johnson papers, 1833-1948

|-

|-

|-

|-

|-

1793 births
1866 deaths
People from Clarksville, Tennessee
People from Robertson County, Tennessee
American people of Scotch-Irish descent
Polk administration cabinet members
United States Postmasters General
Jacksonian members of the United States House of Representatives from Tennessee
Democratic Party members of the United States House of Representatives from Tennessee
American bankers
American lawyers
American slave owners
University of Nashville alumni